General Pringle may refer to:

Andrew Pringle (British Army officer) (born 1946), British Army major general
Andrew Pringle Jr. (born 1927), U.S. Air Force major general
Heather L. Pringle (fl. 1990s–2010s), U.S. Air Force major general
John Pringle (British Army officer) (1774–1861), British Army major general
Robert Pringle (British Army officer) (1855–1925), British Army major general
Steuart Pringle (1928–2013), Royal Marines lieutenant general
William Henry Pringle (1772–1840), British Army lieutenant general